Nikhil Gangta (born 1 September 1992) is an Indian cricketer who plays for Himachal Pradesh. He made his first-class debut for Himachal Pradesh against Goa in 2012-13 Ranji Trophy on 15 December 2012.

In July 2018, he was named in the squad for India Blue for the 2018–19 Duleep Trophy. He scored a century in the final of the tournament, which India Blue went on to win, and he was named the man of the match.

References

External links
 

1992 births
Living people
Indian cricketers
Himachal Pradesh cricketers
India Blue cricketers
Cricketers from Himachal Pradesh